Petro Mykhailovych Oliynyk (born 10 July 1957 – died 10 February 2011) was a Ukrainian career miner and later politician, member of the Verkhovna Rada.

In 1989-1999 he worked as a director for various companies including coal mining (i.e. the 50th Anniversary of the Soviet Union Mine) in Chervonohrad. Later he was a mayor of Chervonohrad. 

In 2002-2005 Oliynyk was a member of Verkhovna Rada representing the People's Movement of Ukraine.

In 2005-2008 he served as a Governor of Lviv Oblast. 

In 2011 Oliynyk died in Austria where he was treated for serious illness.

References

External links
 Profile at the Official Ukraine Today portal

1957 births
2011 deaths
People from Primorsky Krai
Russian people of Ukrainian descent
Russian emigrants to Ukraine
Dnipro Polytechnic alumni
Ukrainian coal miners
Chervonohrad
Governors of Lviv Oblast
Fourth convocation members of the Verkhovna Rada
People's Movement of Ukraine politicians